Frank Israel Smizik (born September 4, 1944 in Pittsburgh) is an American attorney and politician who represented the 15th Norfolk District in the Massachusetts House of Representatives January 2001 until January 2, 2019

Prior to being elected to the House, Smizik was a member of the Brookline, Massachusetts School Committee from 1992 to 2000 and was a member of the Brookline Housing Authority from 1982 to 1992.

Smizik ran unopposed for his Massachusetts legislative seat until 2014, when he defeated Republican challenger Curt Myers 80%–20%.

For twenty-five years, Smizik worked as a legal services lawyer addressing housing and other civil issues facing low income persons.

In December 2017, Smizik announced he would not seek reelection at the end of his then current term. He retired in January 2019.

References

1944 births
21st-century American politicians
Duquesne University alumni
Living people
Democratic Party members of the Massachusetts House of Representatives
Politicians from Brookline, Massachusetts
Politicians from Pittsburgh
University of Pittsburgh alumni